Color of Night is a 1994 American erotic mystery thriller film produced by Cinergi Pictures and released in the United States by Buena Vista Pictures (through its Hollywood Pictures label). Directed by Richard Rush, the film stars Bruce Willis and Jane March.

The cast also features Ruben Blades, Lesley Ann Warren, Brad Dourif, Lance Henriksen, Kevin J. O'Connor and Scott Bakula. It is one of two well-known works by director Rush, the other being The Stunt Man 14 years before.

Color of Night flopped at the box office and won a Golden Raspberry Award as the worst film of 1994. It later, however, became one of the 20 most-rented films in the United States home video market in 1995. Maxim magazine also singled the film out as having the best sex scene in film history.

In 2018, Kino Lorber (under license from Disney) released a special edition Blu-ray of the film; it contains an audio commentary by director Richard Rush.

Plot
Dr. Bill Capa, a New York psychologist, falls into a deep depression after Michelle, an unstable patient, commits suicide in front of him by jumping from his office window. The sight of the bloody body clad in a bright green dress causes Bill to suffer from psychosomatic color blindness, taking away his ability to see the color red. Bill travels to Los Angeles to stay with a friend, fellow therapist Dr. Bob Moore, who invites him to sit in on a group therapy session. However, Bob is violently murdered in the office and Bill is plunged into the mystery of his friend's death.

Lt. Hector Martinez considers everyone in Moore's therapy group, including Bill, as suspects in the murder. Bill continues to live in Bob's house and begins an affair with Rose, a beautiful but mysterious young woman who comes and goes.  Bill takes over the therapy group, which includes: Clark, a temperamental OCD sufferer; Sondra, a nymphomaniac and kleptomaniac; Buck, a suicidal ex-police officer; Casey, who paints sado-masochistic images; and Richie, a 16-year old with gender dysphoria and a history of drug use.

After Casey is murdered, Bill becomes the target of several attempts on his life. He discovers that all but one of his patients have been romantically involved with Rose. He eventually learns that "Richie" is really Rose, and the murders were the work of her deranged brother, Dale. They once had an actual brother named Richie, who hanged himself after being molested by his child psychiatrist Dr. Niedelmeyer, who also abused Dale.

After Richie committed suicide, Dale abused Rose into playing the part of their brother. Rose began to re-emerge during therapy and, under another personality named "Bonnie", started relationships with the other patients. Dale proceeded to kill them, fearing that they would soon link Rose to Richie.

Dale kidnaps Rose, and tries to kill Capa and Martinez with a nail gun when they arrive to rescue her. At the last moment, however, Rose frees herself and kills Dale. Deeply traumatized, she tries to commit suicide, but Capa convinces her to keep living. As they kiss, Capa regains the ability to see the color red.

Cast

Bruce Willis as Dr. Bill Capa
Jane March as Rose
Ruben Blades as Hector Martinez
Lesley Ann Warren as Sondra Dorio
Scott Bakula as Bob Moore
Brad Dourif as Clark
Lance Henriksen as Buck
Kevin J. O'Connor as Casey Heinz
Eriq La Salle as Anderson
Andrew Lowery as Dale Dexter
Kathleen Wilhoite as Michelle
Jeff Corey as Dr Larry Ashland
Shirley Knight as Edith Niedelmeyer

Music

Soundtrack
The soundtrack to Color of Night as composed by Dominic Frontiere, with songs from Lauren Christy, Jud Friedman, Brian McKnight, and Lowen & Navarro was released on August 9, 1994, by Mercury Records.

Release

Theatrical
Richard Rush turned his cut of the film over to producer Andrew Vajna in late 1993. Vajna was concerned about the film's commercial prospects and demanded a recut, something Rush refused. Nonetheless, Vajna mandated he had final cut per contractual obligation, and insisted on testing his own version of the film. After both versions were given a number of test screenings, Vajna determined that his cut would be released and fired Rush in April 1994.

This ultimately escalated into a battle between Rush and Vajna that received  coverage in the Los Angeles trades. Rush commented that his version tested higher than Vajna's cut; his statements were defended in Variety and by film critic Bill Arnold, who attended a test screening of Rush's version in Seattle, Washington. The Los Angeles Times, meanwhile, defended Vajna, stating that Rush stubbornly refused any input from the studio. The Directors Guild of America attempted to intervene on the matter.

The battle ultimately ended when Rush suffered a near-fatal heart attack and became hospitalized. Months later, after Rush recovered, he compromised with Vajna that the producer's cut would be released theatrically and that the director's cut would see a video release.

Eventually, four versions were released:
The R-Rated theatrical release from the USA
The international theatrical release
The R-Rated Director's Cut
The Unrated Director's Cut

(Among them, international theatrical release version also contains numerous scenes that are not included in the Unrated Director's Cut.)

Reception

Box office
The film opened at number 4 at the US box office, grossing $6,610,488 its opening weekend playing at a total of 1,740 theaters. The film grossed only $19,750,470 in the United States and Canada but grossed $27 million internationally for a worldwide total of $46.7 million compared to its $40 million production budget.

Critical response
Rotten Tomatoes retrospectively reported that 22% of 51 critics gave the film a positive review, with an average rating of 4.4/10. The site's critics consensus reads, "Bruce willie shot aside, the only other things popping out in Color of Night are some ridiculous plot contortions and majorly camp moments." Metacritic assigned the film a weighted average score of 36 out of 100, based on 28 critics, indicating "generally unfavorable reviews". Audiences polled by CinemaScore gave the film an average grade of "C" on an A+ to F scale.

Referring to the film as "memorably bizarre," Janet Maslin in her August 19, 1994 The New York Times review wrote: "The enthusiastically nutty Color of Night has the single-mindedness of a bad dream and about as much reliance on everyday logic." She also cited the revelation of the murderer, "whose disguise won't fool anyone, anywhere."
Roger Ebert of the Chicago Sun-Times wrote: "I was, frankly, stupefied. To call it absurd would be missing the point, since any shred of credibility was obviously the first thing thrown overboard. It's so lurid in its melodrama and so goofy in its plotting that with just a bit more trouble, it could have been a comedy."
Luke Y. Thompson of The New Times praised March's performance and wrote: "Minority opinion here, I know, but I found the sex scenes hot and March's performance truly impressive."
Brian McKay of eFilmCritic.com stated the film was a "Mediocre L.A. noir thriller made more tolerable by Jane March disrobing frequently."
Ken Hanke of the Mountain Xpress (Asheville, North Carolina) wrote the film was "Underrated, but far from great."

The film is listed in Golden Raspberry Award founder John Wilson's book The Official Razzie Movie Guide as one of The 100 Most Enjoyably Bad Movies Ever Made.

Accolades
Color of Night won the Golden Raspberry Award for Worst Picture, and was also nominated in eight other categories including Worst Actor (Bruce Willis also for North), Worst Actress (Jane March), Worst Director (Richard Rush), Worst Screenplay, Worst Original Song ("The Color of the Night"), Worst Screen Couple ("Any combination of two people from the entire cast"), Worst Supporting Actor (Jane March as Richie) and Worst Supporting Actress (Lesley Ann Warren). At the 1994 Stinkers Bad Movie Awards, Bruce Willis won the award for Worst Actor (also for North) while Jane March received a nomination for Worst Actress.

Color of Night received a Golden Globe nomination in the category Best Original Song — Motion Picture for its theme song "The Color of the Night", performed by Lauren Christy.

Maxim magazine also awarded Color of Night for having the Best Sex Scene in film history; Rush was especially proud of the award, and he kept it in his bathroom.

Year-end lists
 3rd worst – Desson Howe, The Washington Post
 3rd worst – Dan Craft, The Pantagraph

References

External links 
 
 
 
 
 

1990s American films
1990s English-language films
1990s erotic thriller films
1990s mystery thriller films
1990s psychological thriller films
1990s romantic thriller films
1994 crime thriller films
1994 films
1994 LGBT-related films
American crime thriller films
American erotic romance films
American erotic thriller films
American LGBT-related films
American mystery thriller films
American neo-noir films
American psychological thriller films
American romantic thriller films
Bisexuality-related films
Cinergi Pictures films
Disney controversies
Erotic mystery films
Films about obsessive–compulsive disorder
Films about self-harm
Films about sexuality
Films about trans women
Films directed by Richard Rush
Films produced by Andrew G. Vajna
Films produced by Buzz Feitshans
Films scored by Dominic Frontiere
Films set in Los Angeles
Films set in New York City
Films with screenplays by Billy Ray
Fratricide in fiction
Golden Raspberry Award winning films
Hollywood Pictures films
Incest in film
Lesbian-related films
LGBT-related controversies in film
LGBT-related thriller films
Film controversies
Obscenity controversies in film
Rating controversies in film
Romantic crime films